Heel is a village and former municipality in the southeastern Netherlands. The village is located near the E25 motorway and the river Meuse.

History 
In pre-Roman times, this was the location of the Gallic town of Catualium.

In 1821, the municipality of Pol en Panheel, covering the village of Panheel and the hamlet Pol, merged with Heel to form a municipality called Heel en Panheel. In 1991, it was renamed simply Heel. On January 1, 2007, the municipality of Heel was merged into the municipality of Maasgouw.

Surrounding area 
Major cities in the surrounding areas are;
Roermond (Northeast, 10 kilometers)
Maastricht (South, 45 kilometers)
Eindhoven (Northwest, 50 kilometers)

Notable people
 Lies Visschedijk (born 1974), actress
 Jesse Huta Galung (born 1985), tennis player

Gallery

References

External links
Official website

Municipalities of the Netherlands disestablished in 2007
Populated places in Limburg (Netherlands)
Former municipalities of Limburg (Netherlands)
Maasgouw